Nationality changing in the sport of gymnastics is when a gymnast opts to represent a new country in international competitions.  Gymnasts may request a nationality change through their federations, provided they have citizenship. The number of nationality changes a federation may request for athletes is limited to two per year per discipline and three over all disciplines.  If the previous country gives consent for the gymnast to represent the new country, the gymnast may immediately begin representing the new country in competition.  If consent is not granted, the gymnast will have to wait a year before they can represent the new country.  If a gymnast has already been granted a nationality change, they must wait a minimum of three years before they can make a new request.

This is a list of notable gymnasts who have represented multiple countries in gymnastics competitions and had a valid FIG license for each. This list does not include gymnasts who competed for a new nation after the dissolution of their former country (i.e.: Soviet gymnasts).

Artistic gymnastics

Rhythmic gymnastics

Trampoline gymnastics

See also 
 List of sportspeople who competed for more than one nation

References 

Gymnastics
Gymnasts